Club Atlético Atlas is an Argentine football club from the General Rodríguez district in Buenos Aires Province. Atlas currently plays in Primera D, the fifth division of the Argentine football league system.

Atlas made some impact on the media due to the TV documentary "Atlas, la otra pasión", aired in 2006 on Fox Sports, which made the club known outside Argentina.

History
The club was founded on 17 August 1951 by a group of sportsmen under the name "Club Social y Deportivo Atlas". The team, coached by Ricardo Puga, took part in the Evita children tournaments. In 1965 Atlas affiliated to Argentine Football Association and began to play in the then last division of Argentine football league system, the "Torneo de Aficionados" championship (current Primera D). In 1970 the club changed its name to "Club Atlético Atlas", moving that same year from Colegiales neighborhood in Buenos Aires to the suburb of General Rodríguez, where they had constructed its stadium.

Reputed to be "the worst team in Argentina", the squad was relegated from the last division in 2004, losing its place in the Argentine Football Association's hierarchy of competitive leagues and with it all its players and facilities.

In 2005, being coached by the charismatic Néstor Retamar, Atlas regained its place in the Primera D. One year later, Atlas did not promote, being defeated by Berazategui in the semi-finals of the play-offs and finishing 5th.

in 2008 Retamar left, then returned in 2010. During 2010–11 season, El Marrón proclaimed champion of the Torneo Reducido, defeating Centro Español in the finals, winning 1–0 the first match. Atlas then played the promotion playoffs against Sacachispas, and promoting to Primera C Metropolitana.

Current squad

Managers

 Néstor Retamar (2005–2008)
 Pedro Ponce (2008)
 Guillermo Sezsurack (2008–2010)
 Rolando Boroski (2010)
 Néstor Retamar (2010–2012)
 Juan José Valiente (†) (2013)
 Daniel Zulaica (2013–2014)
 Wálter Piacenza (2014)
 Néstor Retamar (2014–2016)
 César Rodríguez (2016–2019)
 Néstor Retamar (2019–2022)
 César Rodríguez (2023-)

References

External links

 

General Rodríguez Partido
Association football clubs established in 1951
Atletico Atlas
1951 establishments in Argentina